Winja's Fear & Force is the generic term for two spinning roller coasters, Winja's Fear and Winja's Force, at Phantasialand in Germany. They are located in Wuze Town, an indoor area of the park.

The rides consist of two similar tracks which mirror each other at first but also feature some unique sections. The cars seat four people, two facing backwards, and freely spin after the first drop. In theory, this would mean every single ride would spin in a unique pattern. However, several sections of track are designed to make optimal use of the car's momentum, forcing the car to move in certain ways.

The two roller coasters are raised via a vertical lift instead of the traditional lifthill. The Winjas feature a unique hinged section of track about halfway through, with Fear collapsing forward and Force banking sideways in order to continue. The two coasters travel on separate tracks and are intertwined in the main hall of Wuze Town. At the very end of the ride, a little surprise element is built in, which shortly drops a section of track a few feet and raises it again.

The ride is themed to fit the Wuze Town environment, a fictional town of myths and fantasy. The character Winja after whom the rides are named, is the main character of the area. A soundtrack specially written for the Winja's can be heard in the queuing area. Two samples of the soundtrack for the 2000 Disney film Dinosaur are also used during the ride, respectively the lift and hinged sections.

Roller coasters in Germany
2002 establishments in Germany